The Pilbara robust slider (Lerista neander) is a species of skink found in Western Australia.

References

Lerista
Reptiles described in 1971
Taxa named by Glen Milton Storr